
This is a list of aircraft in alphabetical order beginning with 'S'.

Sp

SpaceX 
 SpaceX Falcon 9 "Full Thrust"
 SpaceX Falcon Heavy
 SpaceX Starship
 SpaceX Falcon 1
 SpaceX Falcon 9 v1.0
 SpaceX Falcon 9 v1.1
 SpaceX Grasshopper
 SpaceX Falcon 1e
 SpaceX Falcon 5
 SpaceX Falcon 9 Air
 SpaceX BFR
 SPaceX Raptor
 SpaceX Rideshare

Spacek sro
(Hodonin, Czech Republic)
Spacek SD-1 Minisport

SPAD 
(Société Pour l'Aviation et ses Dérivés)
for post 1917 designs, see: Blériot
 SPAD S.A
 SPAD S.B
 SPAD S.D
 SPAD S.E 
 SPAD S.F
 SPAD S.G
 SPAD S.H
 SPAD S.I
 SPAD S.J
 SPAD S.K
 SPAD S.V
 SPAD S.VII
 SPAD S.XI
 SPAD S.XII
 SPAD S.XIII
 SPAD S.XIV
 SPAD S.XV
 SPAD S.XVI
 SPAD S.XVII
 SPAD S.XVIII
 SPAD S.XIX
 SPAD S.XX
 SPAD S.51 Tailfin

Sparling 
((John Nicholas) Sparling Propeller & Aeroplane Factory, E St Louis, MO)
 Sparling 1912 Biplane

Sparmann 
 Sparmann S-1A
 Sparmann E4
 Sparmann P1 military designation - prototype 1
 Sparmann P3 military designation - prototype 3

Sparrow 
(W W Sparrow, Healdron, OK)
 Sparrow Model 1

Spartan
(UK)
 Spartan Arrow
 Spartan Clipper
 Spartan Cruiser
 Spartan Three Seater

Spartan
(Spartan Aircraft Co, Tulsa, OK)
 Spartan 1927 Biplane
 Spartan 7W Executive
 Spartan 7W-F
 Spartan 7W-P Executive
 Spartan 7X Executive (aka Standard Seven)
 Spartan 8W Zeus
 Spartan 12W Executive
 Spartan C2-60
 Spartan C2-165
 Spartan C3-1
 Spartan C3-2
 Spartan C3-120
 Spartan C3-3
 Spartan C3-4
 Spartan C3-5
 Spartan C3-165
 Spartan C3-166
 Spartan C3-225
 Spartan C4
 Spartan C4-225
 Spartan C4-300
 Spartan C4-301 (a.k.a. E4-301)
 Spartan C5-300
 Spartan C5-301
 Spartan 8W Zeus
 Spartan FBW-1
 Spartan NP
 Spartan NS
 Spartan C-71

Spartan Microlights
Spartan DFD Aerotome
Spartan DFD Aerotome Dual
Spartan DFS Trike

SPCA
(Société Provençale de Construction Aéronautique)
 SPCA Météore 63
 SPCA VII
 SPCA 10
 SPCA 20
 SPCA 30
 SPCA 40T
 SPCA 41T
 SPCA 218
 SPCA 60T
 SPCA 80
 SPCA 81
 SPCA 82
 SPCA 90
 SPCA 91T
 SPCA Paulhan-Pillard I
 SPCA Paulhan-Pillard E.5
 SPCA Paulhan-Pillard T.3 BN.4
 SPCA Hermès

Spearman 
(Sam Spearman, Dunkirk, OH)
 Spearman S-1

Specialized 
(Specialized Aircraft Co (pres: Jack Coroy), Camarillo, CA)
 Specialized Tri Turbo-3

Specter Aircraft
(Bancroft, Idaho, United States)
Specter Aircraft Specter II

Spectrum 
(Spectrum Aircraft Corps, Van Nuys Airport, CA)
 Spectrum SA-550 Spectrum-One
 Spectrum Aircraft SA-26 Vulcan

Spectrum
(Spectrum Aircraft Inc)
 Spectrum Beaver RX-28
 Spectrum Beaver RX-35
 Spectrum Beaver RX-35 Floater
 Spectrum Beaver RX-550
 Spectrum Beaver RX-550 Floater
 Spectrum Beaver RX-550 SP
 Spectrum Beaver RX-550 Plus
 Spectrum Beaver RX-650
 Spectrum Beaver SS
 Spectrum Beaver SS-11 Skywatch (Freedom Lite and Legend Lite)

Spectrum
(Spectrum Aeronautical)
 Spectrum S-33 Independence
 Spectrum S-40 Freedom

Speed 
(Robert E Speed and Ronald Johnson)
 Speed F8F Beercat

Speed Bird 
(Speed Bird Corp (Perth Amboy Title Co), Keyport, NJ)
 Speed Bird 1933 Biplane
 Speed Bird A

Speedtwin
(Speedtwin Developments Ltd)
 Speedtwin E2E Comet 1

Spencer 
(Herbert Spencer)
 Spencer-Stirling biplane
 Spencer 1912 biplane
 Spencer-Farman

Spencer 
(Percy H Spencer, Farmingdale, NY)
 Spencer 1914 flying boat
 Spencer S-10 Monoplane
 Spencer S-12 Air Car
 Spencer S-14 Air Car Junior

Spencer-Larsen 
((Percy H) Spencer-(Victor A) Larsen Aircraft Co, Farmingdale, NY)
 Spencer-Larsen SL-12C

Sperwill Ltd
(Bristol, UK)
Sperwill 120
Sperwill 2+
Sperwill 210
Sperwill 3+
Sperwill CA
Sperwill ST
Sperwill TX

Sperry 
(Lawrence Sperry Aircraft Co, Farmingdale, NY)
 Sperry 1911 Biplane
 Sperry Hi-Lift
 Sperry Land and Sea Triplane
 Sperry Light Bomber
 Sperry M-1 Messenger
 Sperry MAT
 Sperry Sport
 Sperry Sportplane

Spezio 
(Tony & Dorothy Spezio, Bethany, OK)
 Spezio Tuholer (a.k.a. Spezio Sport DAL-1)

Spier 
((Siegmund) Spier Aircraft Corp, Jersey City, New Jersey;)
 Spier Pursuit Trainer

Spijker
(Spijker, from 1915 the Nederlands Automobile and Aeroplane Co.)
 Spijker V.1
 Spijker V.2
 Spijker V.3
 Spijker V.4

Spike 
(Spike Aerospace)
 Spike S-512

Spinks 
(M H Spinks Sr, Ft Worth, TX)
 Spinks Akromaster

Spiral Aircraft
 Spiral S-1
 Spiral S-4
 Spiral S-15
 Spiral S-20
 Spiral S-20E
 Spiral S-150
 Spiral S-150E
 Spiral S-190

Spitfire 
(Spitfire Helicopter Co, Media, PA)
 Spitfire Mark I
 Spitfire Mark II Tigershark
 Spitfire Mark IV

Sport 2000
(Capena, Italy)
Sport 2000 80

Sport Copter 
 Sport Copter 2
 Sport Copter Lightning
 Sport Copter Vortex

Sport Flight 
(Sport Flight Aviation)
 Sport Flight Talon
 Sport Flight Talon Magnum
 Sport Flight Talon XP
 Sport Flight Talon Super Magnum
 Sport Flight Talon Typhoon

Sport Performance Aviation
 Sport Performance Aviation Panther

Sport Racer
(Sport Racer Inc., Valley Center, Kansas, United States)
 Sport Racer

Sport-Jet, Limited
Sport Jet II

Sportavia-Pützer 
 Sportavia-Pützer RF-7
 Sportavia-Pützer RS-180 Sportsman
 Sportavia-Pützer SFS 31 Milan

Spotsy 
(Spotsy Aircraft Corp (Victor Gottchling & Emil W Pwters), 4109 Germaine Ave, Cleveland, OH)
 Spotsy Model 1

Spratt 
(George Spratt / Spratt Aircraft Inc, Costesville, PA)
 Spratt 1912 Biplane
 Spratt 1934 Monoplane
 Spratt Controlwing
 Spratt Controlwing 105
 Spratt Controlwing 106
 Spratt Controlwing 107

Spring
(William J. Spring, Burlington, Ontario, Canada)
Spring WS202 Sprint

Springfield 
(Springfield School of Aviation, Springfield, OR)
 Springfield JM2P

Spyker
 Spyker V.1
 Spyker V.2
 Spyker V.3

References

Further reading

External links

 List Of Aircraft (S)

de:Liste von Flugzeugtypen/N–S
fr:Liste des aéronefs (N-S)
nl:Lijst van vliegtuigtypes (N-S)
pt:Anexo:Lista de aviões (N-S)
ru:Список самолётов (N-S)
sv:Lista över flygplan/N-S
vi:Danh sách máy bay (N-S)